Lethrinops marginatus, also known as the Lethrinops 'rounded head' in the aquarium fish trade, is a species of cichlid endemic to Lake Malawi where it is widespread and occurs in shallow waters over sandy substrates.  This species grows to a length of  SL.

References

marginatus
Fish of Lake Malawi
Fish of Tanzania
Taxa named by Ernst Ahl
Fish described in 1926
Taxonomy articles created by Polbot